Fiat Lux is a 1923 Austrian silent film directed by Wilhelm Thiele and starring Hella Moja, Carmen Cartellieri and Liese Leyde.

Cast
 Hella Moja as Blinde  
 Carmen Cartellieri as Tochter des Ingenieurs  
 Liese Leyde 
 J.W. Steinbeck 
 Jacob Feldhammer

References

Bibliography
Robert von Dassanowsky. Austrian Cinema: A History. McFarland, 2005.

External links

1923 films
Austrian silent feature films
Films directed by Wilhelm Thiele
Films with screenplays by Wilhelm Thiele
Austrian black-and-white films